Jiří Novotný (born 12 July 1988), is a Czech futsal player who plays for Bohemians and the Czech Republic national futsal team.

References

External links
UEFA profile

1988 births
Living people
Czech men's futsal players